Israel Zangwill (14 February 18641 August 1926; birth date sometimes given as 21 January 1864) was a British author at the forefront of cultural Zionism during the 19th century, and was a close associate of Theodor Herzl.  He later rejected the search for a Jewish homeland in Palestine and became the prime thinker behind the territorial movement.

Early life and education
Zangwill was born in Whitechapel, London, on 21 January 1864, in a family of Jewish immigrants from Lithuania, then part of the Russian Empire. His father, Moses Zangwill, was from what is now Latvia, and his mother, Ellen Hannah Marks Zangwill, was from what is now Poland. He dedicated his life to championing the cause of people he considered oppressed, becoming involved with topics such as Jewish emancipation, Jewish assimilation, territorialism, Zionism, and women's suffrage. His brother was novelist Louis Zangwill.

Zangwill received his early schooling in Plymouth and Bristol. When he was eight years old, his parents moved to Spitalfields, East London and he was enrolled in the Jews' Free School there, a school for Jewish immigrant children. The school offered a strict course of both secular and religious studies while supplying clothing, food, and health care for the scholars; presently one of its four houses is named Zangwill in his honour. At this school he excelled and even taught part-time, eventually becoming a full-fledged teacher.

While teaching, he studied for his degree from the University of London, earning a BA with triple honours in 1884.

Career

Writings
Zangwill published some of his works under the pen-names J. Freeman Bell (for works written in collaboration), Countess von S., and Marshallik.

He had already written a tale entitled The Premier and the Painter in collaboration with Louis Cowen, when he resigned his position as a teacher at the Jews' Free School owing to differences with the school managers and ventured into journalism. He initiated and edited Ariel, The London Puck, and did miscellaneous work for the London press.

Zangwill's work earned him the nickname "the Dickens of the Ghetto". He wrote a very influential novel Children of the Ghetto: A Study of a Peculiar People (1892), which the late nineteenth century English novelist George Gissing called "a powerful book".

The use of the metaphorical phrase "melting pot" to describe American absorption of immigrants was popularised by Zangwill's play The Melting Pot, a success in the United States in 1909–10.

When The Melting Pot opened in Washington D.C. on 5 October 1908, former President Theodore Roosevelt leaned over the edge of his box and shouted, "That's a great play, Mr. Zangwill, that's a great play." In 1912, Zangwill received a letter from Roosevelt in which Roosevelt wrote of The Melting Pot "That particular play I shall always count among the very strong and real influences upon my thought and my life."

The protagonist of the play, David, emigrates to America after the Kishinev pogrom in which his entire family is killed. He writes a great symphony named "The Crucible" expressing his hope for a world in which all ethnicity has melted away, and becomes enamored of a beautiful Russian Christian immigrant named Vera. The dramatic climax of the play is the moment when David meets Vera's father, who turns out to be the Russian officer responsible for the annihilation of David's family. Vera's father admits guilt, the symphony is performed to accolades, David and Vera live happily ever after, or, at least, agree to wed and kiss as the curtain falls.

"Melting Pot celebrated America's capacity to absorb and grow from the contributions of its immigrants." Zangwill was writing as "a Jew who no longer wanted to be a Jew. His real hope was for a world in which the entire lexicon of racial and religious difference is thrown away."

Zangwill wrote many other plays, including, on Broadway, Children of the Ghetto (1899), a dramatisation of his own novel, directed by James A. Herne and starring Blanche Bates, Ada Dwyer, and Wilton Lackaye; Merely Mary Ann (1903) and Nurse Marjorie (1906), both of which were directed by Charles Cartwright and starred Eleanor Robson. Liebler & Co. produced all three plays as well as The Melting Pot. Daniel Frohman produced Zangwill's 1904 play, The Serio-Comic Governess, featuring Cecilia Loftus, Kate Pattison-Selten, and Julia Dean. In 1931 Jules Furthman adapted Merely Mary Ann for a Janet Gaynor film.

Zangwill's simulation of Yiddish sentence structure in English aroused great interest. He also wrote mystery works, such as The Big Bow Mystery (1892), and social satire such as The King of Schnorrers (1894), a picaresque novel (which became a short-lived musical comedy in 1979). His Dreamers of the Ghetto (1898) includes essays on famous Jews such as Baruch Spinoza, Heinrich Heine and Ferdinand Lassalle.

The Big Bow Mystery was one of the first locked room mystery novel. It has been almost continuously in print since 1891 and has been used as the basis for three commercial movies.

Another much produced play was The Lens Grinder, based on the life of Spinoza.

Politics

Zangwill endorsed feminism and pacifism, but his greatest effect may have been as a writer who popularised the idea of the combination of ethnicities into a single, American nation. The hero of his widely produced play, The Melting Pot, proclaims: "America is God's Crucible, the great Melting-Pot where all the races of Europe are melting and reforming... Germans and Frenchmen, Irishmen and Englishmen, Jews and Russians – into the Crucible with you all! God is making the American."

Jewish politics
Zangwill was also involved with specifically Jewish issues as an assimilationist, an early Zionist, and a territorialist. After having for a time endorsed Theodor Herzl, including presiding over a meeting at the Maccabean Club, London, addressed by Herzl on 24 November 1895, and endorsing the main Palestine-oriented Zionist movement, Zangwill quit the established philosophy and founded his own organisation, named the Jewish Territorialist Organization in 1905, advocating a Jewish homeland in whatever land might be available  in the world which could be found for them, with speculations including Canada, Australia, Mesopotamia, Uganda and Cyrenaica.

Zangwill is inaccurately known for creating the slogan "A land without a people for a people without a land" describing Zionist aspirations in the Biblical land of Israel. He did not invent the phrase; he acknowledged borrowing it from Lord Shaftesbury. In 1853, during the preparation for the Crimean War, Shaftesbury wrote to Foreign Secretrary Aberdeen that Greater Syria was "a country without a nation" in need of "a nation without a country... Is there such a thing? To be sure there is, the ancient and rightful lords of the soil, the Jews!" In his diary that year he wrote "these vast and fertile regions will soon be without a ruler, without a known and acknowledged power to claim dominion. The territory must be assigned to some one or other... There is a country without a nation; and God now in his wisdom and mercy, directs us to a nation without a country." Shaftesbury himself was echoing the sentiments of Alexander Keith, D.D.

In 1901, in the periodical New Liberal Review, Zangwill wrote that "Palestine is a country without a people; the Jews are a people without a country".

Theodor Herzl fared best with Israel Zangwill, and Max Nordau. They were both writers or 'men of letters' - imagination that engendered understanding. Baron Albert Rothschild had little to do with the Jews.  On Herzl's visits to London, they co-operated closely. In a debate at the Article Club in November 1901 Zangwill was still misreading the situation: "Palestine has but a small population of Arabs and fellahin and wandering, lawless, blackmailing Bedouin tribes." Then, in the dramatic voice of the Wandering Jew, "restore the country without a people to the people without a country. (Hear, hear.) For we have something to give as well as to get. We can sweep away the blackmailer—be he Pasha or Bedouin—we can make the wilderness blossom as the rose, and build up in the heart of the world a civilisation that may be a mediator and interpreter between the East and the West."

In 1902, Zangwill wrote that Palestine "remains at this moment an almost uninhabited, forsaken and ruined Turkish territory". However, within a few years, Zangwill had "become fully aware of the Arab peril", telling an audience in New York, "Palestine proper has already its inhabitants. The pashalik of Jerusalem is already twice as thickly populated as the United States" leaving Zionists the choice of driving the Arabs out or dealing with a "large alien population". He moved his support to the Uganda scheme, leading to a break with the mainstream Zionist movement by 1905. In 1908, Zangwill told a London court that he had been naive when he made his 1901 speech and had since "realized what is the density of the Arab population", namely twice that of the United States. In 1913 he criticised those who insisted on repeating that Palestine was "empty and derelict" and who called him a traitor for reporting otherwise.

According to Ze'ev Jabotinsky, Zangwill told him in 1916 that, "If you wish to give a country to a people without a country, it is utter foolishness to allow it to be the country of two peoples. This can only cause trouble. The Jews will suffer and so will their neighbours. One of the two: a different place must be found either for the Jews or for their neighbours".

In 1917, he wrote "'Give the country without a people,' magnanimously pleaded Lord Shaftesbury, 'to the people without a country.' Alas, it was a misleading mistake. The country holds 600,000 Arabs."In 1921, Zangwill suggested Lord Shaftesbury "was literally inexact in describing Palestine as a country without a people, he was essentially correct, for there is no Arab people living in intimate fusion with the country, utilizing its resources and stamping it with a characteristic impress: there is at best an Arab encampment, the break-up of which would throw upon the Jews the actual manual labor of regeneration and prevent them from exploiting the fellahin, whose numbers and lower wages are moreover a considerable obstacle to the proposed immigration from Poland and other suffering centers".

Quotes 
Zangvill listed the following as his most striking passages:

 What is, is right. If aught seem wrong below, / Then wrong It is — of thee to leave it so — Without Prejudice
 Art is truth seen as beauty —The Master
 Hunted from shore to shore through the ages they had found the national aspiration — peace — in a country where Passover came without menace of blood —Children of the Ghetto
 The Jewish mission will never be In-over till the Christians are converted to the religion of Christ —Dreamers of the Ghetto
 Each poor man Is a rung in the Jacob's ladder by which the rich man may, if he is charitable, mount to heaven—The King of Schnorrers

Views 
In his writings (referenced above), Zangwill expressed mixed sentiments about the then-territory of Palestine, parts of which became the modern State of Israel in 1948, two decades after his death. After the establishment of the state, Philip Rubin speculated that the new state might have met his aspirations.

He was an early suffragist.

During World War I, he adcoated the formation of a Jewish foreign legion to the central powers.

Personal life
Zangwill married Edith Ayrton in 1903. She was a feminist and author, and the daughter of cousins William Edward Ayrton and Matilda Chaplin Ayrton.  Ayrton's stepmother was Hertha Ayrton, who, like Zangwill, was Jewish.

The Zangwill family lived for many years in East Preston, West Sussex in a House called Far End. The couple had three children, two sons and a daughter. The younger of their two sons was the British psychologist, Oliver Zangwill.

Zangwill died of pneumonia on August 1, 1926 at a nursing home in Midhurst, West Sussex. He had spent two months at the nursing home.

Other works
Chosen Peoples, (1919)
The Big Bow Mystery (1892)
The King of Schnorrers (1894)
The Mantle of Elijah (London : Heinemann)
The Master (1895) (based on the life of friend and illustrator George Wylie Hutchinson)
The Melting Pot (1909)
The Old Maid’s Club (1892)
The Bachelors' Club (London : Henry, 1891) 
The Serio-Comic Governess (1904)
Without Prejudice (1896)
Merely Mary Ann (1904)
The Grey Wig: Stories and Novelettes (1903) which include The Grey Wig; Chasse-Croise; The Woman Beater; The Eternal Feminine; The Silent Sisters
Italian Fantasies (1910)

As translator:
Selected Religious Poems of Solomon ibn Gabirol; pub. The Jewish Publication Society of America (1923)

The "of the Ghetto" books:
Children of the Ghetto: A Study of a Peculiar People (1892)
Grandchildren of the Ghetto (1892)
Dreamers of the Ghetto (1898)
Ghetto Tragedies, (1899) 
Ghetto Comedies, (1907)

Filmography
Children of the Ghetto (film), directed by Frank Powell (1915, based on the play Children of the Ghetto)
The Melting Pot, directed by Oliver D. Bailey and James Vincent (1915, based on the play The Melting Pot)
Merely Mary Ann, directed by John G. Adolfi (1916, based on the play Merely Mary Ann)
The Moment Before, directed by Robert G. Vignola (1916, based on the play The Moment of Death)
Mary Ann, directed by Alexander Korda (Hungary, 1918, based on the play Merely Mary Ann)
Nurse Marjorie, directed by William Desmond Taylor (1920, based on the play Nurse Marjorie)
Merely Mary Ann, directed by Edward LeSaint (1920, based on the play Merely Mary Ann)
The Bachelor's Club, directed by A. V. Bramble (1921, based on the novel We Moderns)
We Moderns, directed by John Francis Dillon (1925, based on the play We Moderns)
Too Much Money, directed by John Francis Dillon (1926, based on the play Too Much Money)
, directed by Bert Glennon (1928, based on the novel The Big Bow Mystery)
Merely Mary Ann, directed by Henry King (1931, based on the play Merely Mary Ann)
The Crime Doctor, directed by John S. Robertson (1934, based on the novel The Big Bow Mystery)
The Verdict, directed by Don Siegel (1946, based on the novel The Big Bow Mystery)

Bibliography

References

Own writing 

 "The Return to Palestine", New Liberal Review, Dec. 1901

 "Providence, Palestine and the Rothschilds", The Speaker, vol. 4, no. 125 (22 February 1902).
The War For The World. New York: Macmillan, 1916.
 Hands Off Russia: Speech by Mr. Israel Zangwill at the Albert Hall, February 8th, 1919. London: Workers' Socialist Federation, n.d. [1919].
 The Voice of Jerusalem. New York: Macmillan, 1921.

Bibliography

External links

Literature by and about Israel Zangwill in University Library JCS Frankfurt am Main: Digital Collections Judaica
 
 
 
 
 
 The personal papers of Israel Zangwill are kept at the  Central Zionist Archives in Jerusalem. The notation of the record group is A120.
 Israel Zangwill, The Principle of Nationalities (1917)
 Israel Zangwill and Children of the Ghetto
 The Zionist Exposition
 Jewish Virtual Library
 
 Jewish Museum in London
 
 
Plays by Israel Zangwill written during World War 1 on Great War Theatre

1864 births
1926 deaths
Writers from London
19th-century English novelists
Alumni of the University of London
British Jewish writers
British Zionists
English male novelists
19th-century English dramatists and playwrights
English Jews
British people of Russian-Jewish descent
Jewish novelists
Jewish pacifists
English male dramatists and playwrights
People educated at JFS (school)
Territorialism
19th-century English male writers
20th-century English novelists
20th-century English dramatists and playwrights
20th-century English male writers
Ayrton family
People from East Preston, West Sussex